Winter Sequence is a 1954 Christmas jazz album from American pianist Ralph Burns and British music critic Leonard Feather with an ad hoc ensemble of musicians, released on MGM Records.

Recording, release, and reception
Feather composed the tracks as a musical suite that would allow one musician per track to serve as a soloist, with the orchestra arranged by Burns. A contemporary review for Billboard called the album an "unusual" blend of jazz and pop and concludes that "jazz aficiandos will like it most". The album was released as a 10" LP, followed in 1958 by a 12" LP entitled The Swinging Seasons (catalog number E 3613) that also included Dick Hyman's "The Swingin' Seasons", "Sounds of Spring", "Summer Sequence", and "Early Autumn".

Track listing
All songs written by Ralph Burns and Leonard Feather
"Dasher" (solo by Herbie Mann) – 2:42
"Dancer" (solo by Danny Bank) – 3:11
"Prancer" (solo by Ralph Burns) – 2:54
"Vixen" (solo by Kai Winding) – 4:08
"Comet" (solo by Oscar Pettiford) – 2:52
"Cupid" (solo by Billy Bauer) – 3:12
"Donner" (solo by Osie Johnson) – 3:16
"Blitzen" (solo by Joe Wilder) – 2:20

Personnel
Danny Bank – saxophone
Billy Bauer – guitar
Ralph Burns – piano, arrangement
Osie Johnson – drums
Herbie Mann – flute
Oscar Pettiford – double bass
Joe Wilder – trumpet
Kai Winding – trombone

References

External links

1954 Christmas albums
Albums arranged by Ralph Burns
Collaborative albums
Concept albums
Instrumental albums
Leonard Feather albums
MGM Records albums
Ralph Burns albums
Suites (music)